Machines is an EP by Manfred Mann, released in 1966. The EP is a 7-inch vinyl record and released in mono with the catalogue number His Master's Voice-EMI 7EG 8942.  The record was the number 1 EP in the UK number-one EP for 1 week, starting May 28, 1966.

Track listing
Side 1
 "Machines" (Mort Shuman) 
 "She Needs Company" (Paul Jones)

Side 2
 "Tennessee Waltz" (Redd Stewart) 
 "When Will I Be Loved" (Phil Everly)

Background
For this EP, Manfred Mann's third and last number 1 EP, they chose several non R & B songs to cover including Tennessee Waltz, the best-known version being by Patti Page and the Everly Brothers When Will I be Loved. Jack Bruce is the bassist on these tracks.

Chart performance
The record reached the Number 1 spot on the UK's EP charts on May 28, 1966.

References

 liner notes
Footnotes

1966 EPs
EMI Records EPs
Manfred Mann EPs
His Master's Voice EPs